Phragmophora is an order of sagittoideans in the phylum Chaetognatha.

Families
Eukrohniidae Tokioka, 1965
Heterokrohniidae Casanova, 1985
Krohnittellidae Bieri, 1989
Spadellidae Tokioka, 1965

See also
Taxonomy of invertebrates (Brusca & Brusca, 2003)
Taxonomy of the animals (Hutchins et al., 2003)

References

External links

Chaetognatha
Protostome orders
Taxa named by Takasi Tokioka